The building of the newspaper Soviet South is a building in Rostov-on-Don which was built in 1911 in the Art Nouveau style. It is located on the intersection of Khalturinsky lane and Shaumyan street. The building has the status of an object of cultural heritage of regional significance.

History of the building 
The Soviet South building was built in 1911 as a revenue house commissioned by the merchant A. A. Levanidov, the nephew of the mayor of the city and the owner of the brick factory I. S. Levanidov. During the Russian Civil War, artist N. S. Albionov, ballerina N. M. Dobin and journalist N. V. Apassky lived in this house.

Since the mid-1920s, the offices of the regional newspapers Sovetsky Yug and Komsomolets were located on the top floor of the house. There, next to the working rooms, in the room with a view of the Don River, lived writer A. A. Fadeev. In 1959, in memory of this, a memorial plaque with the text was installed on the facade: "Here in 1924-1926 worked in the editorial board of the Soviet South writer Fadeyev Alexander Alexandrovich (1901-1956). Living in this house, he wrote a famous novel, The Rout."

Currently, the building is residential. On the ground floor there are shops.

References 

Buildings and structures in Rostov-on-Don
Buildings and structures completed in 1911
Cultural heritage monuments in Rostov-on-Don
Cultural heritage monuments of regional significance in Rostov Oblast